All TV K is a Canadian exempt Category B Korean language specialty channel with English subtitles and is owned by All TV Inc.  It broadcasts programming from KBS World as well as local Canadian content.

All TV K features programming from Korea's public broadcaster KBS. Programming includes news, movies, drama, sports, cultural programmes and documentaries.

History
KBS World, an unrelated channel owned by Seabridge Media, launched in June 2006. It is currently unclear due to lack of evidence, however, sometime in 2009, Seabridge Media shut down, leading to the closure of KBS World. Due to the closure of KBS World, All TV Inc stepped in and launched its own version of KBS World in July 2009 on Rogers Cable allowing the service to remain on the air, using its own licence granted by the Canadian Radio-television and Telecommunications Commission (CRTC).

In late 2012, KBS World Canada was renamed All TV K.  On July 18, 2013, All TV K was added to Bell Fibe TV.

See also
 All TV (Canadian TV channel)
KBS World

External links
 All TV K schedule 
 KBS America

World Canada
Korean-Canadian culture
Digital cable television networks in Canada
Multicultural and ethnic television in Canada
Korean-language television stations
Television channels and stations established in 2006